The Sulu gollumshark (Gollum suluensis) is a species of ground shark in the family Pseudotriakidae, found off Palawan Island in the southern Philippines.

Named for the type locality Sulu Sea, Philippines.

References 

Gollum (genus)
Taxa named by Peter R. Last
Fish described in 2011